Cetiosaurus meaning 'whale lizard', from the Greek / meaning 'sea monster' (later, 'whale') and / meaning 'lizard', is a genus of herbivorous sauropod dinosaur from the Middle Jurassic Period, living about 168 million years ago in what is now Europe.

Cetiosaurus was in 1842 the first sauropod from which bones were described and is the most complete sauropod found in England. It was so named because its describer, Sir Richard Owen, supposed it was a marine creature, initially an extremely large crocodile, and did not recognise it for a land-dwelling dinosaur. Because of the early description many species would be named in the genus, eventually eighteen of them. Most of these have now been placed in other genera or are understood to be dubious names, based on poor fossil material. The last is true also of the original type species, Cetiosaurus medius, and so C. oxoniensis was officially made the new type species in 2014. C. oxoniensis is based on three more or less complete specimens, discovered from 1868 onwards. Together they contain most of the bones, with the exception of the skull.

Cetiosaurus oxoniensis was a "primitive", quadrupedal, long-necked, small-headed herbivore. It had a shorter tail and neck than most sauropods. The forelimbs on the other hand, were relatively long.

Discovery and species

Initial finds
 
Cetiosaurus is, with the exception of the tooth genus Cardiodon, the first sauropod to be discovered and named as well as being the best known sauropod from England. Numerous species have been assigned to Cetiosaurus over the years belonging to several different groups of sauropod dinosaurs. The genus thus functioned as a typical "wastebasket taxon". Fossilized remains once assigned to Cetiosaurus have mainly been found in England but also in France, Switzerland and Morocco.

The first fossils, vertebrae and limb elements, were discovered near Chipping Norton in the early nineteenth century and were reported upon by collector John Kingdon in a letter read on 3 June 1825 to the Geological Society; they were seen as possibly belonging to a whale or crocodile. In 1841 biologist, comparative anatomist and palaeontologist Sir Richard Owen, named these as the genus Cetiosaurus, the year before he coined the term Dinosauria. Owen initially did not recognise Cetiosaurus for a dinosaur but considered it a gigantic sea-dwelling reptile. This was reflected by the name, derived from Greek κήτειος, kèteios, "sea-monster". In 1842 Owen named two species in the genus: Cetiosaurus hypoolithicus and Cetiosaurus epioolithicus. The specific names reflected whether the finds had been made below (hypo) or above (epi) the so-called oolithic layers. The first species was based on the material of Kingdon; the latter on vertebrae and metacarpals found at White Nab in Yorkshire. The publication did not contain a sufficient description and the species are often considered nomina nuda. The same year in a subsequent publication Owen named four additional Cetiosaurus species: Cetiosaurus brevis, "the short one"; Cetiosaurus brachyurus, "the short-tailed"; Cetiosaurus medius, "the medium-sized", and Cetiosaurus longus, "the long one". Owen had abandoned the two earlier names, as shown by the fact that their fossils were referred to several of the new species. These again were each mostly based on disparate material, from often geographically widely separated sites. As became apparent in 1849, some of these bones were not sauropod in nature at all but of Iguanodontidae. That year Alexander Melville, in a misguided attempt to clear matters up, named the authentic sauropod material of C. brevis as Cetiosaurus conybeari but thereby merely created a junior objective synonym of the former name.

Cetiosaurus oxoniensis
 
In March 1868, workers near Bletchingdon discovered a sauropod right femur. Between March 1869 and June 1870 Professor John Phillips, further investigating the site, in a layer dating from the Bathonian uncovered three skeletons and additional bone material. In 1871 based on these he named two species: Cetiosaurus oxoniensis (originally spelled Ceteosaurus Oxoniensis) and Cetiosaurus glymptonensis. "Oxoniensis" refers to Oxford, "glymptonensis" to Glympton. Already in 1870 Thomas Huxley had published a letter by Phillips in which the latter named a Cetiosaurus giganteus based on specimen OUMNH J13617, a left femur earlier found at Bletchingdon; as the letter did not contain a description, this is a nomen nudum.

 
A century later, a new C. oxoniensis specimen (LCM G468.1968) called the "Rutland Dinosaur" was discovered on 19 June 1968 by the driver of an excavating vehicle. It was found at the base of the Rutland Formation dating to the Bajocian. Staff from Leicester City Museums arrived on 20 June 1968. It was not confirmed that all the preserved material was collected. It is the most complete sauropod fossil, and one of the most complete specimens of a dinosaur, ever found in the United Kingdom. It was only in around 1980 that there was interest in the fossil. It took around four years to find the dinosaur bones. Of the about two hundred bones in a cetiosaurus, it has preserved a nearly complete cervical series (2–14), most of the dorsal vertebrae, a small part of the sacrum and anterior caudals, the chevrons, the ilium, the right femur, and rib and limb fragments.

Only the more structurally-sound parts of the dinosaur are on display, with the more-fragile parts stored elsewhere. Much of what can be seen in the display is a representation (replica), and not the actual dinosaur. The model's vertebral column seen on display has fourteen cervicals, ten dorsals, five sacrals and about fifty caudals. The dinosaur display was taken to London to be featured on the children's television programme Blue Peter.

Later species
In 1874, John Whitaker Hulke named Cetiosaurus humerocristatus, "with a crested humerus", based on specimen BMNH 44635, a humerus found that year at Sandsfoot near Weymouth in Dorset. In 2010, this was made a separate genus Duriatitan. In 1905, Arthur Smith Woodward renamed Ornithopsis leedsii Hulke 1887 into Cetiosaurus leedsi. This today is often considered a nomen dubium. In 1970 Rodney Steel renamed Cardiodon Owen 1841, based on a now lost tooth, into Cetiosaurus rugulosus, "the wrinkled one". If the species were cogeneric to Cetiosaurus, the name of the genus would however be Cardiodon as this name has priority. In 2003, Upchurch & Martin rejected the identity.

In addition to the thirteen species based on British material, three were named by French researchers. In 1874, Henri-Émile Sauvage named Cetiosaurus rigauxi based on a vertebra found by Edouard Edmond Joseph Rigaux at Le Portel, west of Boulogne-sur-Mer, in layers dating from the Tithonian. In 1903 however, he was forced to conclude it represented a pliosaurid. In 1880, Sauvage named another species: Cetiosaurus philippsi. In 1955, Albert-Félix de Lapparent named Cetiosaurus mogrebiensis based on three skeletons found in Morocco from the El Mers Formation dating to the Bathonian. The specific name refers to the Maghreb. This is today sometimes seen as a valid taxon, but one not belonging to Cetiosaurus. In 2011, Eric Buffetaut e.a. referred a chevron found in the French Ardennes, specimen A775, to a Cetiosaurus sp.

A Cetiosaurus species has been based on Swiss material. In 1932, Friedrich von Huene renamed Ornithopsis greppini Huene 1922 into Cetiosaurus greppini. This is today considered a nomen dubium. In 2020, it was proposed to assigned C. greppini to the new genus Amanzia.

The question of the type species

In principle for every genus a type species must be indicated to serve as its type in an ostensive definition. Traditionally, C. medius had been considered the type species of Cetiosaurus. In 1888 Richard Lydekker had formally assigned C. oxoniensis as the type species but by the modern rules of the ICZN one of the species named by the original author, in this case Owen, must be selected. In 2003, Paul Upchurch and John Martin determined that C. "hypoolithicus" and C. "epioolithicus" could not be used because they were nomina nuda. Of the four species named in Owen's second 1842 article, C. brevis, C. brachyurus, C. longus and C. medius, only C. brevis  would not be a nomen dubium. This they interpreted as implying that C. brevis was the type species. This conclusion, if correct, would cause considerable taxonomic instability, because the genus Pelorosaurus had since been based on its fossils, and recognized as a totally different kind of sauropod. Therefore, Upchurch & Martin suggested to request the ICZN to change the type species into C. oxoniensis, the best known species from the Middle Jurassic, which the genus Cetiosaurus had generally come to be identified with.

However, in 2009, when their request was officially filed, Upchurch and Martin had changed their position. They acknowledged that being designated a nomen dubium does not prevent a species from having been made the type of a genus. Furthermore, they had identified a passage in the 1842 article in which Owen himself had already assigned C. medius as the type species: "it is principally on these bones [i.e. those of C. medius], with others subsequently discovered and in the collection of Mr. Kingdon, that the characters of the Cetiosaurus were first determined". Nevertheless, they still advocated a change in type because C. medius is known only from undiagnostic material. Its syntype series consists of eleven separate tail vertebrae, (specimina OUMNH J13693–13703), some sacral ribs with a foot bone (metatarsal, OUMNH J13704–13712), a hand bone (metacarpal, OUMNH J13748), and a claw (OUMNH J13721), probably from different fossil sites and different individuals.

The ICZN accepted the proposal to change the type species in 2014 (Opinion 2331), officially making C. oxoniensis the type species in place of the original C. medius. Making C. oxoniensis the type species of Cetiosaurus secured the name Cetiosaurus for the animal with which it has been traditionally associated.

Valid Species
 
The complex naming history can be summarised in a list of Cetiosaurus species:
Cetiosaurus oxoniensis Phillips, 1871: type species of Cetiosaurus

Doubtful species
Cetiosaurus hypoolithicus Owen, 1841: nomen nudum
Cetiosaurus epioolithicus Owen, 1841: nomen nudum
Cetiosaurus brachyurus Owen, 1842: nomen dubium
Cetiosaurus longus Owen, 1842: nomen dubium; = Cetiosauriscus longus (Owen, 1842) McIntosh, 1990
Cetiosaurus medius Owen, 1842: nomen dubium
Cetiosaurus giganteus Owen vide Huxley, 1870: nomen nudum
Cetiosaurus philippsi Sauvage, 1880

Misassigned and reclassified species
Cetiosaurus brevis Owen, 1842: non Cetiosaurus, = Cetiosaurus conybeari Melville, 1849; = Pelorosaurus conybearei (Melville, 1849) Mantell, 1850; = Pelorosaurus brevis (Owen, 1842) Huene, 1927
Cetiosaurus glymptonensis Phillips, 1871: non Cetiosaurus; = Cetiosauriscus glymptonensis (Phillips, 1871) McIntosh, 1990, non Cetiosauriscus
Cetiosaurus rigauxi Sauvage, 1874: non Cetiosaurus, pliosaurid
Cetiosaurus humerocristatus Hulke, 1874: non Cetiosaurus; = Ornithopsis humerocristatus (Hulke, 1874) Lydekker, 1889; = Pelorosaurus humerocristatus (Hulke, 1874) Sauvage, 1897; = Duriatitan humerocristatus (Hulke, 1874) Barrett, Benson & Upchurch, 2010
Cetiosaurus leedsi (Hulke, 1887) Woodward, 1905: nomen dubium; = Ornithopsis leedsii Hulke, 1887
Cetiosaurus greppini (Huene, 1922) Huene, 1932: nomen dubium, = Ornithopsis greppini Huene, 1922 = Amanzia greppini (Huene, 1922) Schwarz et al., 2020
Cetiosaurus rugulosus (Owen, 1845) Steel, 1970: non Cetiosaurus, = Cardiodon Owen, 1841; = Cardiodon rugulosus Owen, 1845
Cetiosaurus mogrebiensis de Lapparent, 1955: non Cetiosaurus

Description

Cetiosaurus, or specifically the neotype species C. oxoniensis, is known from relatively complete fossils. These include the three skeletons found by Phillips. One of these is a larger animal (catalogued as OUMNH J13605–13613, J13615–16, J13619–J13688 and J13899), which was chosen by Upchurch & Martin as the lectotype of the species; the second consists of limb bones of a smaller individual (OUMNH J13614) and the third skeleton represents the shoulder blade and hindlimb of a juvenile animal (OUMNNH J13617–8, J13780–1). The Rutland specimen, about 40% complete, increases considerably the number of known skeletal elements, especially in the neck. The skull is largely unknown, perhaps with the exception of the brain case represented by specimen OUMNH J13596. A single tooth crown, OUMNH J13597, has provisionally been referred to the species.

Cetiosaurus was, as any sauropod, a long-necked quadrupedal animal. Its neck was moderately long; no longer than its body. The tail was considerably longer, consisting of at least forty caudal vertebrae. Its dorsal vertebrae, the bones along the back, had the original heavy build with limited air chambers, unlike the extremely hollowed-out bones of later sauropods like Brachiosaurus. Its forearm was as long as the upper arm, unlike most other sauropods, resulting in a forelimb equalling the hindlimb in length. Its thigh bone was approximately six feet long.
 
In his original descriptions, Owen was unable to indicate any differences between Cetiosaurus and other sauropods for the simple reason these latter were not yet discovered. Now that such relatives have been found, the uniqueness of Cetiosaurus oxoniensis and its status as a valid taxon must be proven by indicating its new derived traits or autapomorphies. In their 2003 revision of the genus, Upchurch & Martin identified five autapomorphies of C. oxoniensis. The rear neck vertebrae and the front back vertebrae have spines on their tops that are low, symmetrical and in the shape of a pyramid. With the spines of all back vertebrae a ridge is absent between the spine and the diapophysis, the top rib joint; it has been lost or perhaps fused with the ridge running between the spine and the postzygapophysis, the rear joint process. The vertebrae of the middle tail have a tongue-shaped process at the top of the front face of the vertebral body; this is an extension of the floor of the neural canal. The chevrons of the front tail vertebrae have shafts of which the lower ends are flattened from the front to the rear instead of transversely. The lower process of the ilium, to which the pubic bone was attached, features on the outer surface of its base a triangular depression.

Classification and phylogeny
 
Owen initially was unsure about the precise relationships of Cetiosaurus. He understood it was a reptile and most researchers at the time accordingly assigned it to the Sauria. However, he at first did not recognise its dinosaurian nature; when in 1842 he named the Dinosauria, Cetiosaurus was not included. This was influenced by the preconception that such a large animal must have been sea-dwelling. Owen assumed crocodylian affinities. In the early 1850s, Gideon Mantell began to suspect that Cetiosaurus was a land animal as a result of his studies of Pelorosaurus. This idea however, was only slowly accepted by other scientists. In 1859 Owen still classified Cetiosaurus in the Crocodylia. In 1861, Owen concentrated all such forms in a group of their own: the Opisthocoelia. In 1869 Thomas Huxley stated explicitly that Cetiosaurus was a dinosaur.

In 1888 Lydekker assigned Cetiosaurus to its own family: the Cetiosauridae. For a long time this functioned as a large ill-defined family of typically "primitive" sauropods. Today however, many considerably more basal sauropods than Cetiosaurus are known. Modern exact cladistic research has not resulted in a single clear outcome about the position of Cetiosaurus oxoniensis in the sauropod tree. Sometimes a Cetiosauridae was recovered, a clade uniting Cetiosaurus oxoniensis with species as the Indian Barapasaurus, the South American Patagosaurus or the African Chebsaurus. Other studies indicate that the traditional Cetiosauridae were paraphyletic and recover Cetiosaurus oxoniensis in a basal position in the Eusauropoda, basal in the Neosauropoda or just outside of this clade.

Paleobiology

Cetiosaurus shared its time period with, and was possibly prey to Megalosaurus, possibly Streptospondylus and Cruxicheiros. The environment in which Cetiosaurus lived was floodplain and open woodland. Paul considered Cetiosaurus a feeding generalist, eating at both a low and a medium-high level, in view of its moderately long neck and limb proportions.

References

Bibliography 
 
Owen, R. 1842. Second rapport sur les reptiles fossiles de la Grande-Bretagne. L’Institut, Journal général des Sociétés et Travaux Scientifique de la France et de l’ Étranger, 10: 11–14 on Google Books.
Owen, R. 1875. Monograph of the Mesozoic Reptilia, part 2: Monograph on the genus Cetiosaurus. Palaeontolographical Society Monograph, 29: 27–43.

Cetiosauridae
Bathonian life
Middle Jurassic dinosaurs of Europe
Jurassic England
Fossils of England
Middle Jurassic dinosaurs of Africa
Jurassic Morocco
Fossils of Morocco
Fossil taxa described in 1841
Taxa named by Richard Owen